Ictalurus lupus (the bagre lobo or headwater catfish) is a species of catfish in the family Ictaluridae. It is found in Northeastern Mexico and the Southwestern United States.

References

lupus
Freshwater fish of Mexico
Freshwater fish of the United States
Fish of the Western United States
Fauna of the Rio Grande valleys
Fish described in 1858
Taxonomy articles created by Polbot